The Zbrojovka Z 18 was a car produced by Československá Zbrojovka in the 1920s. Derived from the more powerful of two Z 26 designs developed following the Disk, the Z 18 was first produced in 1925. The car was produced in a variety of body types, including a four seat open-top phaeton fitted with one, two and four doors, limousine and landaulet and a two-door roadster. A total of 2,510 vehicles were produced before production ceased in 1930.

Background
After the failure of the Disk, Zbrojovka was determined that its next car design would be a success. The company had a new engineering team that included the talented František Mackrle and he designed two new designs, both named Z 26, with different engine sizes. The car passed the tests and entered production as the 4/18 or Z 18 in 1925.

Design and development
The Z 18 had a rectangular frame with rigid axles. The water cooled, two-stroke two-cylinder engine drove the rear wheels through a three speed gearbox.
The standard car was fitted with 730 x 130 disc wheels, although more expensive versions had Rudge-Whitworth wire wheels. The basic body style was a four seat phaeton which cost 35,000 Kčs in 1926. It was open-top with a single door on the left, steering wheel on the right and a bench seat that was accessed by lowering the left front seat.

The range of body types available increased over the car's production life. In September 1926, a limousine version was launched at the Prague Motor Show at a price of 40,500 Kčs.  This had a fixed roof with four side windows and more equipment, including an electric cigar lighter and coat hanger. A sports roadster was also available, priced at 45,000 Kčs.  Gradually over time, two and four door phaetons, landaulets and other custom designs were added to the range. There was also a pickup truck capable of carrying a  payload.

Production
2,510 vehicles, including 1,000 commercial vehicles, were sold between 1926 and 1930.

References

Cars introduced in 1926
Cars of the Czech Republic
Rear-wheel-drive vehicles